Group A is one of two groups of the 2023 IIHF World Championship. The four best placed teams advance to the playoff round, while the last placed team will be relegated to Division I in 2024.

Standings

Matches
All times are local (UTC+3).

Slovakia vs Czechia

Latvia vs Canada

Switzerland vs Slovenia

Norway vs Kazakhstan

Slovakia vs Latvia

Slovenia vs Canada

Norway vs Switzerland

Czechia vs Kazakhstan

Slovakia vs Canada

Czechia vs Latvia

Slovenia vs Norway

Switzerland vs Kazakhstan

Latvia vs Norway

Canada vs Kazakhstan

Czechia vs Slovenia

Switzerland vs Slovakia

Latvia vs Slovenia

Kazakhstan vs Slovakia

Norway vs Czechia

Canada vs Switzerland

Kazakhstan vs Latvia

Slovenia vs Slovakia

Czechia vs Switzerland

Canada vs Norway

Kazakhstan vs Slovenia

Slovakia vs Norway

Canada vs Czechia

Switzerland vs Latvia

References

External links
Official website

B